The Fåglum brothers were Swedish cyclist Erik, Gösta, Sture and Tomas Pettersson. The brothers won the team time trial World Amateur Cycling Championships between 1967–1969 along with a silver medal at the 1968 Summer Olympics. They were all awarded the Svenska Dagbladet Gold Medal in 1967.

References

External links 
 The Pettersson Brothers at worldcupvargarda.se
 Die Fåglum-Brothers at youtube.de

 
Sibling quartets
Swedish male cyclists
Sportspeople from Västra Götaland County